The Big Picture is a documentary film directed by John Doggett-Williams about filmmakers Charles and Elsa Chauvel and their eight feature films made between 1926 and 1955.

The film, which runs for 1 hour 14 mins, is included as an "extra" in each of Umbrella Entertainment's series Charles Chauvel Collection, published both as individual titles and as a boxed set.

The film has extensive interviews with Susanne Chauvel Carlsson, Michael Pate, and Ric Carlsson as well as documentary footage of the Chauvels, with representative out-takes from each film. Bryan Dawe provided the commentary.

The Big Picture is based on The Life and Cinema of Charles Chauvel by Susanne Chauvel Carlsson (1930 – 19 March 2013), daughter of Charles and Elsa Chauvel.

References 

Documentary films about film directors and producers
Australian documentary films